Virginia gained nine representatives from the 1790 census, and in addition, the old  was lost after its territory became the new State of Kentucky. There were, therefore, ten new districts created for the 3rd Congress.

See also 
 United States House of Representatives elections, 1792 and 1793
 List of United States representatives from Virginia

References 

Virginia
1793
United States House of Representatives